Tjongsfjorden is a fjord in the municipality of Rødøy in Nordland county, Norway. The mountain Blokktinden lies on the southern shore of the fjord. The villages of Tjong and Vågaholmen lie along the northern shore of the fjord. Norwegian County Road 17 runs along the inner part of the fjord.

See also
 List of Norwegian fjords

References

Fjords of Nordland
Rødøy